In astronomy, the Vaughan–Preston gap refers to the absence of F-, G- and K-type stars with intermediate levels of magnetic activity.  That is, Vaughan and Preston noted  two groups of stars with either high or low levels of activity, separated by an apparent gap.  There remains no consensus on the cause of the gap.

References 

Magnetic field
Magnetism in astronomy